"Reflections" is a 1967 song recorded by The Supremes for the Motown label. It was the first Supremes record released under the new billing, Diana Ross & the Supremes, and is among their last hit singles to be written and produced by Motown's main production team Holland–Dozier–Holland (H–D–H).

It peaked at number 2 on the United States Billboard Hot 100 pop singles chart and number 5 on the UK Singles Chart in September 1967.

Background
This single, released at the height of the Summer of Love of 1967 and the Vietnam War, was the first Supremes' release to delve into psychedelic pop; H–D–H's production of the song, influenced by the psychedelic rock sounds of bands such as The Beatles and The Beach Boys, represented a shift in Motown's pop sound during the latter half of the 1960s. The psychedelic influence is apparent in the song's arrangement. Although it is sometimes cited as one of the first mainstream pop recordings to feature a Moog synthesizer, the unusual sounds on the track were generated on a test oscillator and treated with effects. The Supremes' label Motown did eventually purchase a Moog III synthesizer in December 1967.

Release and reception
"Reflections" peaked during the late summer and early fall of 1967. Making the highest debut on Billboard Hot 100 on the week of August 6, the song reached number 2 on the week ending September 9, 1967. One place short of being the group's 11th American number 1 single, "Reflections" stalled at the penultimate position for two weeks behind Bobbie Gentry's "Ode to Billie Joe", which Diana Ross re-recorded as a solo for the Reflections album. The single peaked at number 5 on the UK Singles Chart.

Cash Box said that "electronic effects are put to much use on this new outing from the Detroit mill, and the feedback play adds a cute appeal to the steady throbbing blues lament for an old love."

The first nationally televised performance to feature Ballard's replacement Cindy Birdsong as a member of The Supremes on American television, now billed as "Diana Ross & the Supremes," was on an episode of the ABC variety program The Hollywood Palace. The episode was hosted by entertainer Sammy Davis Jr. and first broadcast on September 26, 1967.

A 2003 remix of the song, running 3:16, contains the looped section that closes the 2:50 hit version in the fade-out, features a cold closing as originally recorded.

The first part of this song was used in the title sequence of China Beach that ran in the US from 1988 to 1991. It was also sampled in "Uh Huh Oh Yeh," the opening track on Paul Weller's eponymous debut solo album released in 1992.

Track listing
7-inch single (July 24, 1967) (North America/United Kingdom)
"Reflections" – 2:50
"Going Down for the Third Time" – 2:30

Personnel
Lead vocals by Diana Ross
Background vocals by Mary Wilson and Marlene Barrow
Instrumentation by the Funk Brothers
Earl Van Dyke – Wurlitzer electric piano, Hammond organ, test oscillator
James Jamerson – bass guitar
Richard "Pistol" Allen – drums
Joe Messina – guitar
Jack Ashford – percussion

Charts

Weekly charts

Year-end charts

Certifications

References

External links
 

1967 singles
The Supremes songs
Songs written by Holland–Dozier–Holland
Motown singles
Psychedelic soul songs
1967 songs
Song recordings produced by Brian Holland
Song recordings produced by Lamont Dozier
Television drama theme songs